La Cité du Vin tram stop is located on line B of the Tramway de Bordeaux. The stop is located on Quay Bacalan in the commune of Bordeaux and is operated by Transports Bordeaux Métropole. Initially known as Bassins à Flot tram stop, it opened on 27 July 2007 when line B was extended from Quinconces and served as terminus of that line until 20 October 2008, when the line was extended to Claveau.

The tram stop was originally named after the nearby Bassins à flot dock. It gained its current name in May 2016 with the opening of the adjacent Cité du Vin wine museum and tourist attraction. Just north of the tram stop, the line crosses over the entrance lock to the Bassins à flot, with trams normally using a route over a swing bridge at the downstream end of the lock, but with an alternative route available via the other end of the lock if the main bridge is swung open. The tram stop has two tracks and two side platforms.

For most of the day on Mondays to Fridays, trams run at least every five minutes in both directions. Services run less frequently in the early morning, late evenings, weekends and public holidays.

Interchange 
 Buses of the TBC:

Close by 
 CAP Sciences
 FRAC Aquitaine

References

Bordeaux tramway stops
Tram stops in Bordeaux
Railway stations in France opened in 2007